Together is the debut studio album by British classical crossover duo Jonathan and Charlotte, released on 24 September 2012. The duo began recording the album in May 2012, after signing a £1m record deal with Simon Cowell's label Syco Music. It was produced by Graham Stack at Metrophonic Studios in Surrey, England over a period of 8 weeks.

The album includes Italian covers of various songs from the likes of Elton John, Muse, Take That, R.E.M., Queen, and Peggy Seeger. They released the first song on the album, "The Prayer," together with the act that finished in third place in 2012, Only Boys Aloud. Having most recently peaked at Number 5 in the UK Album Charts, the duo are due to release their album in the USA and Canada on 30 October 2012.

Track listing

Charts and certifications

Weekly charts

Year-end charts

Certifications

Release history

References

2012 albums
Jonathan and Charlotte albums
Crossover (music)